Eberswalde is a major town and the administrative seat of the district Barnim in the German State (Bundesland / federated state) of Brandenburg, about 50 km northeast of Berlin. Population 42,144 (census in June 2005), geographical location . The town is often called Waldstadt (forest town), because of the large forests around it, including the Schorfheide-Chorin Biosphere Reserve. Despite this fact, Eberswalde was an important industrial center until the German Reunification.

History

Prehistory

The area around Eberswalde was already populated in Paleolithic. Before the establishment of the Margraviate of Brandenburg it was the place of a Slavic stockade. The Treasure of Eberswalde, the largest pre-Christian gold treasure from the area of today's Germany was found here. Today the treasure is located in the Pushkin Museum in Moscow.

Founding and development
The town of Everswolde ("forest of the boars") was established in 1254 by the Ascanian margrave Johann I. It was first mentioned in a document dated April 23, 1276 when margrave Albrecht III. resided there. In 1300 it received market rights. From the year 1317 the main trade route between Stettin and Frankfurt (Oder) went through the city. A major fire struck the city in 1499.

After rebuilding the town, Eberswalde became the first industrial town of the Margraviate of Brandenburg, with huge metallurgy capacities. Some parts of the town are still named from their past function, like Kupferhammer ("copper hammer"). 1605 till 1620 the important waterway Finow Canal was built.

Thirty Years' War
During the Thirty Years' War Eberswalde was besieged and conquered several times by nearly every important faction of the war. The general of the Catholic League, Albrecht von Wallenstein, resided in the town, later Gustavus Adolphus of Sweden, who did not survive the battle of Lützen, was embalmed in the town's Maria Magdalena church. Both parties forced the town population to support their troops. After the end of the war only twenty inhabitants of Eberswalde were still alive, and Eberswalde needed more than a century to recover from its losses.

Rebirth and growth
Between 1743 and 1755 120 families of metalworkers moved from Thuringia and the Rhineland to Eberswalde. The boilers of the first German steam engines were made here. During the 19th century large factories were built in the area of Eberswalde, especially along the Finow Canal. In 1830 it became the site of what is now the Hochschule für nachhaltige Entwicklung Eberswalde. On November 23, 1877 the first German telephone line was established in the town.

20th century
The world's first radio concert was broadcast from Eberswalde in 1923. Werner Forssmann received his 1956 Nobel Prize in Physiology or Medicine for his 1929 experiments with cardiac catheterization performed on his own heart, whilst resident in Eberswalde.

In the 1938 pogroms, Eberswalde's synagogue was destroyed. During World War II, several factories employed forced labourers and inmates of the Ravensbrück concentration camp. At the end of the war, the town center was attacked by the German Luftwaffe, in an attempt to delay the Soviet advance. After learning that Soviet forces had taken Eberswalde without a fight, Adolf Hitler admitted defeat in his underground bunker and stated that suicide was his only recourse.

In 1970 Eberswalde was merged with the settlement of Finow to create Eberswalde-Finow. In 1993 the name Eberswalde was restored.

Demography

Mayor

Since December 2006 Friedhelm Boginski (FDP) is the mayor of Eberswalde.
The former mayor Reinhard Schulz (independent) was unelected in July 2006 with 91,2 % of the votes.

Transport
Eberswalde has access to the federal highways (Bundesstraße) B 2 and B 167 and the highway (Autobahn) A 11-E28. Eberswalde station is located on the Berlin–Szczecin railway line that first connected Eberswalde and Berlin in 1842. It is the starting point of the railway lines to Templin and Frankfurt (Oder) and was terminus of the Eberswalde-Finowfurter-Eisenbahn (EFE) to Finowfurt until it was discontinued.

The town and its industrial areas are on the Oder Havel Canal and Finow Canal waterways. The airfield Flugplatz Finow is a  former Soviet Air Force base that was handed over to civil use on May 11, 1993.

The town had a tram service until 1940, when the trams were replaced by the trolleybuses. Eberswalde is one of only three towns in Germany where trolleybuses are still in operation, along with Solingen and Esslingen.

Economy

While Eberswalde was renowned for its thriving heavy industry in the past, since the fall of the wall, it has fallen upon harder times.  As the East German government fell, state support vanished, and factories had to suddenly compete with more efficient firms in the West.  As a result, many factories in Eberswalde went under, and visitors can see the remnants of these abandoned plants across town.  Like many former East German towns, Eberswalde has since struggled with unemployment, and many have left the region in search of work elsewhere.  Consequently, many of the huge Soviet-Bloc style apartment complexes in Eberswalde (most notably the Brandenburgisches Viertel) are becoming empty, and are slowly being razed.

Culture

Festivals
Carnival
Compared to other towns of the region, Eberswalde has quite a huge Carnival society. It was brought to Eberswalde from Bavaria and from the Rhineland, both are standing for different Carnival traditions. That's why Carnival is celebrated in two independent festivals at the same time, they are called Karneval and Fasching.

Rock me Magdalena

Rock me Magdalena is a rock concert in the Maria Magdalena church of Eberswalde, taking place every December 25.

Filmfest Eberswalde

Since 2004 there is the annual Eberswalde Movie Festival for Independent Film and Documentaries.

Culinary traditions
There are some foods that are associated with Eberswalde. The most important of them are Eberswalder Spritzkuchen (a special pastry that was invented in Eberswalde in 1832) and Eberswalder Würstchen (sausages).

Language
The tongue spoken in the region of Eberswalde is often called Eberswalder Kanaldeutsch (canal German). It is not an independent German dialect, but a very extreme mix of the Berlin Dialect and a bit of East Low German. Other forms of Kanaldeutsch, that are derived from the Eberswalde form, nearly developed back to the Berlin Dialect. That's why Eberswalder Kanaldeutsch is the only one that is in fact sometimes considered as an independent German dialect.

Gardens
The Forstbotanischer Garten Eberswalde is a historic botanical garden and arboretum.

Notable people

 Bernard Altum (1824–1900), zoologist
 Bernhard Danckelmann (1831–1901), forestry scientist
 Hans-Jürgen Döscher (born 1943), historian
 Hans Dresig (born 1937), professor of technical mechanics
 Werner Forßmann (1904–1979), doctor, Nobel Prize laureate
 Robert Hartig (1839–1901), forestry scientist
 Erwin Hagedorn (1952–1972), known as  child murderer of Eberswalde 
 Ralf Hauptmann (born 1968), football player
 Candida Höfer (born 1944), photographer
 Erich Lindemann (1894–1934), doctor and leading member of the Reichsbund Jewish Veterans  and one of the victims of the so-called Night of long knives
 Friedrich Mieth (1888–1944), General of Infantry
 Albrecht Milnik (born 1931), forestry scientist
 Christiane Nord (born 1943), translation scholar
 Wilhelm Pfeil (1783–1859), forestry scientist
 Julius Theodor Christian Ratzeburg (1801–1871), zoologist, entomologist and forestry scientist
 Albert Richter (1909–2007), forestry scientist
 Rudolf Schmidt (1875–1943), city engineer
 Ursula Werner (born 1943), actress
 Paul Wunderlich (1927–2010), painter and sculptor of the Fantastic Realism
 Eva Zeller (born 1923), author

Coat of arms
The emblem shows a green oak tree and above the oak tree a red eagle. Towards the oak's bole stand two black boars. The flag of Eberswalde is a black/white/green tricolour with the crest in the middle.

Twin towns – sister cities

Eberswalde is twinned with:
 Delmenhorst, Germany
 Gorzów Wielkopolski, Poland
 Herlev, Denmark

Gallery

See also
Experimental Radio Station Eberswalde

References

External links

  

 https://web.archive.org/web/20070313195700/http://www.eberswalde.biz/
 http://www.eberswalde.tv

 
Localities in Barnim